Woh Mere Bin is a 2020 Hindi song written by Sachin Gupta and sung by Atif Aslam.

Background 
Kumar Taurani owner of Tips said: “Tips has released a 10 year-old song sung by Atif Aslam.  This song is a rare gem that lost its way a long time ago. It’s a song that we have had since a decade with Atif Aslam but somehow we kept pushing the release forward, but during this quarantine we got an opportunity to officially release the song."

Music video 
Teaser was released on 19 April 2020 by Tips Musicon YouTube. Music video was released on 21 April 2020 and has over 7 million views on YouTube as of August 2020. It features Atif Aslam (singing) and Sachin Gupta (playing the guitar). As it was released during COVID-19 pandemic, Therefore, it ends with the positive message "Be Safe, Be Positive" and "Please Stay Home".

Credits 
Credits adapted from YouTube.

 Song – Woh Mere Bin
 Singer – Atif Aslam
 Music Director & Lyricist – Sachin Gupta
 Producer – Kumar S. Taurani
 Label – Tips Music

References 

Atif Aslam songs
2020 songs
Hindi songs
Indian songs